A dog writer is someone who writes about dogs, for example in reporting on dog shows; or in writing articles about dog care or training or breed features for publications about dogs; or in writing dog- or pet-care columns or 'human' interest articles about dogs for general publications.

In 1935 the term was apparently first used when the Dog Writers Association was established. They state 'Some 70 years ago, there was no such thing as a dog writer. There were newsmen and newswomen and magazine writers. Most of the papers assigned sportswriters, reporters, and even copyboys, to cover dog shows. Still, these were the ones who made the dog world an indelible part of our popular culture by writing about dogs on the sports pages of most papers.'

References

Dogs in popular culture
Writing occupations
Journalism occupations